Gao Feng (born 1986) is a Freestyle wrestler from People's Republic of China.  He won the bronze medal at Asian Games 2010. He also won World Fair Play Award in 2010. Gao Feng became the first Chinese World Fair Play Award winner.

See also 
Asian Games 2010

References

External links 
 Euro Sports News
 CN TV News

Wrestlers at the 2010 Asian Games
1986 births
Living people
Chinese male sport wrestlers

Asian Games bronze medalists for China
Asian Games medalists in wrestling
Medalists at the 2010 Asian Games
21st-century Chinese people